Kostadin "The Laptop" Angelov (born 9 January 1973) is a Bulgarian  football manager. He holds a Pro license from the Bulgarian Coaching School and a higher education with a Master's degree from the NSA "Vasil Levski" with a degree in Sports Management. He has two children, Gergana Angelova (born 1999), and Daniel Angelov (born 2008).

Early life and career
He grew up in the school of CSKA and competed for "Chardafon" (Gabrovo) and "Vidima-Rakovski" (Sevlievo).

Coaching career
He started his coaching career in Sevlievo, as an assistant to Plamen Markov, setting a record for the youngest specialist leading a team in Group A. After Plamen Markov left, when the club's management voted for him, he managed to promote the team of FC "Vidima-Rakovski" (Sevlievo) to the highest Bulgarian division, the A Group. In 2008 he was appointed head coach of Botev (Plovdiv), in 2009 he left for Indonesia, where he coached the team of "Pro Duta". In September 2010 he was appointed as coach of Pirin (Blagoevgrad). He managed to preserve Pirin (Blagoevgrad)'s place in the A Group despite the difficult financial situation of the club. After the bankruptcy of Pirin (Blagoevgrad) he took over FC Vidima-Rakovski (Sevlievo) for the second time, and in the decisive promotion/relegation playoff for the A Group he managed to save the Sevlievo team as well, thus becoming the only coach who has managed to retain the top flight status of two teams in one season. In 2013 he led Pirin "Gotse Delchev" in "A" group and in 2014-2015 Oborishte (Panagyurishte) in "B" group. He left the club, leaving him in the first place. In 2015 he took over Vitosha (Bistritsa) in amateur football and in 3 years he managed to climb the club to the First League after a barrage against Neftohimik (Burgas). In 2018 he managed to save the football club Vitosha (Bistritsa), winning the barrages for promotion / stay in the First League against Pirin (Blagoevgrad) and Lokomotiv (Sofia). The following year he retired from coaching and began to hold the position of general manager of Vitosha (Bistritsa).He have the main credit for the ascent of Vitosha from the amateur to the top league. In October 2020, Angelov returned to management, being appointed as head coach of Yantra Gabrovo, replacing Stoyan Atsarov.

Achievements

As player
Best player in the amateur league 
Amateur league cup

As coach

2003-Youngest coach ever in premiere Bulgarian league.

2006-Win playoff for 1st division (premier league) with Vidima-Rakovski  (second time in history of club).

2007-Invited for national team coach U16.

2009-International conference of sport 2009 in State University, Indonesia.

2010-Coaching first Bulgarian FIFA Pro team.

2011-Bulgarian cup semi-finalist with Pirin (Blagoevgrad)

2012-The only coach to have managed to rescue two teams in A Group in one season

2006, 2015, 2016, 2017- Promotion in highest leagues

2018-  Wnning the barrages for promotion / stay in the First League

2020- Managed to save Yantra (Gabrovo) football club from relegation from second league

Education

1990-1994 
National Sport Academy "Vasil Levski" - Sofia -
Bachelor
		
2005 
UEFA - Soccer coaching school in Sofia -
licensee-UEFA "А"
		
2006-07 
UEFA- Soccer coaching school in Sofia
licensee-UEFA "PRO"#0093

2016 
National Sport Academy "Vasil Levski" - Sofia -
Master's Degree in Sports Management

References

Bulgarian footballers
Bulgarian football managers
1973 births
Living people
Botev Plovdiv managers
Association football defenders